Shoot the Messenger is a Canadian political and crime drama television series that aired on CBC Television from October 10, 2016 to December 5, 2016. The series was not renewed for a second season.

Produced by Hungry Eyes Film and Television, the series stars Elyse Levesque as Daisy Channing, a young Toronto journalist who witnesses an apparent gang-related murder and is drawn into a criminal underworld with ties to the city's political and business elite. The series also stars Alex Kingston as her editor Mary Fowler, Lucas Bryant as her coworker Simon Olendski, and Lyriq Bent as police homicide detective Frank Lutz. Supporting cast members include Hannah Anderson, Ari Cohen, Edie Inksetter, Al Sapienza and Nicholas Campbell, as well as guest appearances by Ed Robertson, Jamaal Magloire and Rick Fox.

Producer and creator Sudz Sutherland acknowledged that the series was indirectly inspired by the Rob Ford video scandal of 2013, but stated that the series is not meant to be interpreted as being about Ford in any literal way.

Cast
 Elyse Levesque as Daisy Channing, a reporter for The Gazette
 Lucas Bryant as Simon Olendski, Daisy's co-worker at The Gazette
 Lyriq Bent as Frank Lutz, a Metro Police homicide detective
 Alex Kingston as Mary Foster, the editor of The Gazette 
 Hannah Anderson as Chloe Channing, Daisy's sister and Sam Charles' executive assistant
 Ari Cohen as Sam Charles, the Attorney General of Ontario
 Edie Inksetter as Jordana Ortiz, homicide detective and Frank's partner
 Maurice Dean Wint as Phil Hardcastle, Chief of Staff to the Attorney General
 Patrick Kwok-Choon as Roger Deacon, another reporter for The Gazette

Episodes

References

External links

 Shoot the Messenger
 
 TheTVDB.com show information

CBC Television original programming
2016 Canadian television series debuts
2016 Canadian television series endings
2010s Canadian crime drama television series
Television shows filmed in Toronto
Canadian political drama television series
Television shows set in Toronto